The Big Ten Conference Men's Soccer Player of the Year is an annual award given to the top performing college soccer player in the Big Ten Conference. In 2009, the award was split into two honors: the offensive and defensive players of the year.

Key

Winners

Player of the Year (1991–2008)

Offensive Player of the Year (2009–present)

Defensive Player of the Year (2009–present)

Midfielder of the Year (2013–present)

Goalkeeper of the Year (2013–present)

References 

College soccer trophies and awards in the United States
Player of the Year
Big Ten
Awards established in 1991